Edward Crouch (November 9, 1764February 2, 1827) was a member of the U.S. House of Representatives from Pennsylvania.

Early life 
Edward Crouch was born at Walnut Hill in the Province of Pennsylvania on November 9, 1764. His father James Crouch was an officer of the Revolution and his mother was named Hannah Brown.

American Revolutionary War 
At the age of seventeen, Crouch enlisted during the American Revolutionary War. He commanded a company in the Whisky Rebellion of 1794.

Political career 
He was a member of the Pennsylvania House of Representatives from 1804 to 1806.  He was appointed associate judge of Dauphin County, Pennsylvania, on April 16, 1813, but resigned upon election to Congress.

Crouch was elected as a Democratic-Republican to the Thirteenth Congress to fill the vacancy caused by the resignation of John Gloninger. He owned slaves.

Later life and death 
He returned to Walnut Hill and resided there until his death in 1827. Interment in Paxtang Cemetery near Harrisburg, Pennsylvania.

References 

1764 births
1827 deaths
Politicians from Philadelphia
People of colonial Pennsylvania
Democratic-Republican Party members of the United States House of Representatives from Pennsylvania
Members of the Pennsylvania House of Representatives
Pennsylvania state court judges
American slave owners
Continental Army soldiers